Ed Malyon is a British sports journalist who is Managing Director of UK Operations for The Athletic. He was formerly the sports editor of The Independent and the weekend football editor of the Daily Mirror.

Education 
Malyon received a B.A. in Spanish and French from Manchester University.

Career 
Malyon began his journalism career as a freelance writer, reporting on South American football for The Daily Mirror, Sports Illustrated, ESPN, The Guardian and FourFourTwo. He joined the Daily Mirror full-time in 2013 and was later made deputy sports editor and European football correspondent.

Malyon was appointed sports editor of The Independent in 2017 while still only 27, the youngest in the history of Fleet Street to be given the role. He was the host of The Indy Football Podcast, nominated for ‘best podcast’ at the 2017 Football Supporters Federation awards.

He left the Independent on 17 May 2019 to join startup US sports website The Athletic.

Malyon has also contributed to the TalkSport’s NFL Show, and European Football Show, The Anfield Wrap, the Radio 5 Live shows Fighting Talk and The Football Daily, as well as the Irish podcast Second Captains.

Personal life
Malyon is a supporter of Crystal Palace FC.

References 

The Independent people
Living people
British newspaper journalists
British newspaper editors
Daily Mirror people
Alumni of the University of Manchester
British sports journalists
Year of birth missing (living people)
British sportswriters